The 2019–20 Fairfield Stags men's basketball team represented Fairfield University in the 2019–20 NCAA Division I men's basketball season. The Stags, led by first-year head coach Jay Young, played their home games at Webster Bank Arena in Bridgeport, Connecticut and Alumni Hall in Fairfield, Connecticut as members of the Metro Atlantic Athletic Conference. They finished the season 12–20, 8–12 in MAAC play to finish in a tie for eighth place. They lost in the first round of the MAAC tournament to Manhattan.

Previous season
The Stags finished the 2018–19 season 9–22 overall, 6–12 in MAAC play to finish in a three-way tie for ninth place. As the 10th seed in the 2019 MAAC tournament, they were defeated by No. 7 seed Manhattan in the first round 53–57.

On March 11, 2019, head coach Sydney Johnson was fired. He finished at Fairfield with an eight-year record of 116–147. On April 3, Rutgers assistant Jay Young was announced as Johnson's replacement.

Roster

Schedule and results

|-
!colspan=12 style=| Non-conference regular season

|-
!colspan=9 style=| MAAC regular season

|-
!colspan=12 style=| MAAC tournament
|-

|-

Source

References

Fairfield Stags men's basketball seasons
Fairfield Stags
Fairfield Stags men's basketball
Fairfield Stags men's basketball